"Me and Baby Brother" is a song written and performed by War. It reached #15 on the U.S. pop chart and #18 on the U.S. R&B chart in 1974. It was featured on their 1973 album Deliver the Word.  A live version of the song entitled "Baby Brother" originally appeared on the 1971 album All Day Music.

The song was produced by Howard E. Scott, Jerry Goldstein, and Lonnie Jordan.

The song ranked #95 on Billboard magazine's Top 100 singles of 1974.

War re-released the song as a single in the UK in 1976 where it reached #21 on the UK Singles Chart.

Other versions
That Petrol Emotion released a live version of the song on their 1987 EP Live 33RPM.
Stevie Salas released a version of the song on his 1998 album Cover Me in Noise.

In popular culture
The Killing Joke song "Change" bears a resemblance to "Me and Baby Brother", which Killing Joke have acknowledged.

References

1971 songs
1973 singles
1976 singles
Songs written by Lonnie Jordan
War (American band) songs
That Petrol Emotion songs
Song recordings produced by Jerry Goldstein (producer)
United Artists Records singles